Gareth Lloyd Rees (born 30 June 1967) is a Canadian former international rugby union footballer who played at fly-half and full back positions. Rees played for several British club sides, including Wasps and Harlequins. He won 55 caps for Canada, captaining them on 23 occasions and scoring 487 test points. In October 2011, Rees received arguably his greatest honour with induction to the IRB Hall of Fame. He and fellow 2011 inductee Brian Lima of Samoa are the first members of the IRB Hall from nations outside of the traditional top tier of the sport.

Rugby career
Rees was born in Duncan, British Columbia, to Alan Rees who had emigrated to Canada from Wales, and was himself a former rugby union footballer having represented Cross Keys, Maesteg and London Welsh. Rees was educated at St. Michaels University School in Victoria and later at Harrow School in England. When studying at Harrow, he was selected to the Wasps starting XV in what was then the John Player Cup final in 1986.

He played club rugby with Castaways, Wasps, Mérignac, Newport, Oxford University, Harlequins, and the Barbarians. Whilst at Wasps he helped them win the Anglo-Welsh Cup in 1999, 13 years after his last appearance in the final, scoring two conversions and four penalties as they defeated Newcastle Falcons.

Rees played in all of the first four Rugby World Cup tournaments, the 1987, 1991, 1995 and 1999. He retired after the 1999 finals becoming the only player to play at the first four Rugby World Cups.

In the 1995 World Cup Rees together with James Dalton and Rod Snow were sent off for fighting in a Canada vs South Africa match that came to be known as the Battle of Boet Erasmus. All three players received a 30-day suspension. Rees did not regret coming to the aid of his team mates, and said after the incident, "We're a very tight team. The guys love each other."

He was inducted in the British Columbia Rugby Hall of Fame.

In 2011 he was inducted in the World Rugby Hall of Fame as the first and only Canadian.
In 2014 he was inducted in the Canada Sports Hall of Fame as the first and only rugby player.

Rees donated one of his rugby boots to be bronzed and used as a trophy to be competed for annually by St. Michaels and Oak Bay High School.

References

External links
 Wasps profile
 Planet-Rugby

1967 births
Living people
World Rugby Hall of Fame inductees
Sportspeople from British Columbia
Canadian rugby union players
Oxford University RFC players
Newport RFC players
Barbarian F.C. players
People from Duncan, British Columbia
Rugby union fly-halves
Rugby union fullbacks
Canadian people of Welsh descent
People educated at Harrow School
Canada international rugby union players
Canadian expatriate rugby union players
Expatriate rugby union players in Wales
Expatriate rugby union players in England
Canadian expatriate sportspeople in England
Wasps RFC players
Harlequin F.C. players